Michael Dreher may refer to:

 Michael Dreher (director) (born 1974), German film director and screenwriter
 Michael E. Dreher (born 1944), Swiss politician